John Wesley (November 25, 1928 – February 10, 2022) was an American painter, known for idiosyncratic figurative works of eros and humor, rendered in a precise, hard-edged, deadpan style. Wesley's art largely remained true to artistic premises that he established in the 1960s: a comic-strip style of flat shapes, delicate black outline, a limited matte palette of saturated colors, and elegant, pared-down compositions. Harvard Art Museums, Hirshhorn Museum, Memphis Brooks Museum of Art, Museum Ludwig (Germany), Museum of Modern Art, Museum of Contemporary Art, Los Angeles, Portland Art Museum, Rose Art Museum, Seattle Art Museum, Stedelijk Museum (Amsterdam), Whitney Museum, and Wadsworth Atheneum.

He was recognized with a Guggenheim Fellowship in 1976, and awards from the National Endowment for the Arts and American Academy of Arts and Letters, among others.

References

Further reading 
 Heiss, Alanna (2000). John Wesley: Paintings 1961–2000 (1st ed.). New York: Distributed Art Publishers. .

External links 

 Wesley's page at Fredericks and Freiser
 Linda Norden on John Wesley's Umami, Chinati Foundation, 2019

1928 births
2022 deaths
20th-century American painters
21st-century American painters
American male painters
American pop artists
American printmakers
Artists from Los Angeles
Painters from New York City
Minimalist artists
20th-century American male artists